Pekania is a genus of mustelid that contains a single living species, the fisher (Pekania pennanti). Formerly placed in the genus Martes, it was determined to be distinct enough to be placed within its own genus. A 2013 study also identified several fossil species formerly in Martes that are more closely related – and probably ancestral – to the fisher, moving them into Pekania as well.

Taxonomy
The fisher was for many years placed in the genus Martes. In 2008, advances in DNA analysis allowed a more detailed study of the fisher's evolutionary history. The fisher and the genus Martes were determined to have descended from a common ancestor, but the fisher was distinct enough to put it in its own genus. It was decided to create the genus Pekania and reclassify the fisher as Pekania pennanti. Current studies suggest that the fisher is more closely related to the wolverine and tayra than it is to martens, further supporting its placement in the new genus.

Evolution
Although endemic to North America today, Pekania probably traces its ancestry to Asia, with the first species known from between 2.5 and 5.0 million years ago. Two extinct members of the genus known from East Asia are Pekania palaeosinensis and P. anderssoni,  though P. anderssoni is often considered to be a synonym of P. palaeosinensis. The first North American member of the genus, P. diluviana, has only been found in Middle Pleistocene North America. P. diluviana is strongly indicated to be related to the Asian finds, which suggests a migration. The modern fisher has been found as early as the Late Pleistocene era, about 125,000 years ago. No major differences are seen between the Pleistocene fisher and the modern fisher. Fossil evidence indicates that the fisher's range extended farther south than it does today.

References

Martens
Mammal genera
Mammal genera with one living species